Serafim Papakostas (21 January 1959 – 29 December 2020) was a Greek Orthodox bishop in the Metropolis of Kastoria (since 1996). 

He died from COVID-19 on 29 December 2020, during the COVID-19 pandemic in Greece, twenty-three days before his 62nd birthday.

References

External links 

Bishops of the Church of Greece
1959 births
2020 deaths
Deaths from the COVID-19 pandemic in Greece
People from Karditsa (regional unit)